, literally Half of Eternity, is a 1987 Japanese film directed by Kichitaro Negishi.

Synopsis
An unemployed young man who has just broken up with his girlfriend meets a woman at a bicycle race. They start dating but then strange things then begin to happen to him, including a beating from the local yakuza.

Cast
 Saburō Tokitō
 Shinobu Otake
 Tomoko Nakajima
 
 Kazuko Yoshiyuki
 Takuzo Kawatani
 Masahiko Tsugawa
 Satomi Kobayashi
 Toshiya Fujita

Background

Awards
9th Yokohama Film Festival
 Won: Best Actor - Saburō Tokitō
 Won: 4th Best Film

12th Hochi Film Awards
 Won: Best Actress - Shinobu Otake

References

External links
 
 
 

1987 films
Films directed by Kichitaro Negishi
Toho films
1980s Japanese films